Château de La Falize was built in the 15th and 16th centuries with 20th century additions. It is in the province of Namur in Wallonia (one of the three regions of Belgium).

Etymology and geography
The name of the Château is derived from the Latin word Falise (Cliff, French:falaise) because of its position close to the top edge of a steep declivity of the valley sides of the river Meuse at the foot of which is city of Namur. Just south west of the Château the steep side of the Meuse valley is cut by the Houyoux, a tributary of the Meuse, which has created a smaller valley in the steep declivity of the Muse valley. The Houyoux is used by the land transport routes from Gembloux and Namur, to descend into the Meuse valley from the plain above.

History

In 1638, King Philip IV of Spain, leased this manor in 1638 to Gilles I of Glymes, Lord of La Falize, for the sum of 1500 florins. Honore de Glymes-Brabant, son of Ignace-François de Glymes-Brabant, Lord of la Falize built most of the current structure in 1757.

The Château was the headquarters of William of Orange during the Siege of Namur in 1695.

Notes

References

Further reading
 
 
 

Castles in Belgium
Castles in Namur (province)